Not Dark Yet is a duet album between sisters and country/Americana singer-songwriters Shelby Lynne and Allison Moorer. Produced by British folk artist Teddy Thompson, Not Dark Yet was released on August 18, 2017. It is Moorer's ninth studio album, Lynne's fifteenth and marks the first official studio collaboration between the siblings. The title track is taken from the Bob Dylan song of the same name.

Not Dark Yet features covers of songs from a variety of genres and also includes an original song written by Lynne and Moorer.

On August 10, 2017, the album was available to listen to in its entirety on NPR as part of their "first listen" series.

Critical reception

AllMusic's Thom Jurek says, "Despite singing together since they were old enough to talk, it took a lifetime for sisters Shelby Lynne and Allison Moorer to record together."

Will Hermes reviewed the album for Rolling Stone and gave it 3½ out of a possible 5 stars. He writes, "the title track is the crown jewel, showing the
river-deep musicality of a latter-day Dylan croaker when it’s parsed by
immaculate, blood-kin harmony."

Paste Magazine'''s Jon Young rates this album an 8.8 and says, "Not Dark Yet works beautifully. Featuring nine covers and one devastating original, this lovely longplayer spotlights their tangy harmonies, with Lynne’s saltier vocals and Moorer’s sweeter singing intertwining gracefully, evoking ancient traditions of family music-making."PopMatters''' Richard Driver gives the album 8 out of a possible 10 and writes, "The most surprising element to this enjoyable and thoughtful album is that this is their first duet album. That the songs are covers is ultimately irrelevant to the care, arrangements, and deliberate duet Lynne and Moorer deliver, the songs finding their strength and shared focus to push ahead after loss."

Commercial performance
The album debuted at No. 8 on both the Billboard's Americana/Folk Albums and Independent Albums charts, and No. 39 on Top Country Albums, with 3,700 copies sold in the first week.  It has sold 6,400 copies as of September 2017.

Track listing

Personnel
Credits adapted from AllMusic.

Russ Allen – assistant
Scott Campbell – engineer
Erik Deutsch – organ, piano
Sarah Ellison Lewis – photography
Don Heffington – drums, percussion
Mark Howard – mixing, special sound
Michael Jerome – drums, percussion
Peter Lyman – mastering
Shelby Lynne – lead vocals, harmony vocals, acoustic guitar
Val McCallum – acoustic guitar, electric guitar
Allison Moorer – lead vocals, harmony vocals, acoustic guitar, piano
Davey Faragher – bass guitar
Ben Peeler – electric guitar, pedal steel guitar
Doug Pettibone – acoustic guitar, electric guitar
Taras Prodaniuk – bass
Benmont Tench – keyboard, organ, piano, wurlitzer 
Teddy Thompson – producer, bass, drums, acoustic guitar, background vocals

Charts

References

2017 albums
Shelby Lynne albums
Allison Moorer albums